Tentaspina venus is a moth of the family Erebidae first described by Michael Fibiger in 2011. It is found on the Philippines (it was described from Quezon).

The wingspan is about 12 mm. The head, labial palps, basal half of the thorax, patagia and basal half of the tegulae are brown. The forewings are whitish beige, suffused with silvery, mirror-like scales. The costa is black basally, just like the quadrangular upper, medial and terminal areas, including the fringes. There are small black costal dots basally, subbasally, and subapically. The crosslines including the medial shade are orange brown and waved. The terminal line is only indicated by black interveinal dots. The hindwings are dark grey throughout. The underside of the forewing is unicolorous brown and the underside of the hindwing is grey with a discal spot.

References

Micronoctuini
Moths described in 2011
Taxa named by Michael Fibiger